This is a list of events and standings for the Professional Fighters League, a mixed martial arts organization based in the United States, for the 2021 season.

PFL's 2021 roster included 60 fighters competing across six weight classes. The late additions to the season were the welterweights Gleison Tibau, Alexey Kunchenko and Jason Ponet, featherweights Chris Wade and Anthony Dizy, women’s lightweights Kaitlin Young and Taylor Guardado and light heavyweight Nick Roehrick.

2021 world champions

Rule Changes

A fighter who is overweight on the scale at weigh-ins will be deducted one point in the standings in the PFL's season structure. In previous seasons, a fighter who missed weight could not earn any points even in a victory, but no standings points were actually taken away until now.

In 2021, the top four fighters per division after the regular season will make the playoffs, a number down from the eight who made the playoffs in men's divisions in previous seasons. The women's lightweight division will have the top four make the playoffs the way it did in 2019, the PFL's most recent season. The four athletes making the playoffs will advance directly to the semifinals in each division. There will be no quarterfinals, nor a situation where a fighter must win twice in a single night.

Events
The first event of the 2021 PFL season will kick off on April 23, 2021. The prelims were broadcast on ESPN+, while the main card was broadcast on ESPN2. All of the regular season events were held in the Atlantic City, New Jersey, at the Ocean Casino Resort in a “bubble environment”. All fighters will undergo a 17-day quarantine period, as a precaution for COVID-19.

The trio of events constituting the season playoffs will be held at the Seminole Hard Rock Hotel & Casino Hollywood in Hollywood, Florida.

2021 PFL Heavyweight playoffs

2021 PFL Light Heavyweight playoffs

2021 PFL Welterweight playoffs

 João Zeferino was originally scheduled to face Magomed Magomedkerimov but was unable to continue in the tournament. He was replaced by #5 ranked Sadibou Sy.

2021 PFL Lightweight playoffs

2021 PFL Featherweight playoffs

2021 PFL Women's Lightweight playoffs

* Larissa Pacheco was originally scheduled to face Taylor Guardado but was unable to continue in the tournament. She was replaced by #5 ranked Mariana Morais.

Standings
The PFL points system is based on results of the match.  The winner of a fight receives 3 points.  If the fight ends in a draw, both fighters will receive 1 point. A no-contest will be scored as a draw.  The bonus for winning a fight in the first, second, or third round is 3 points, 2 points, and 1 point respectively. The bonus for winning in the third round requires a fight be stopped before 4:59 of the third round.  No bonus point will be awarded if a fighter wins via decision.  For example, if a fighter wins a fight in the first round, then the fighter will receive 6 total points. A decision win will result in three total points.  If a fighter misses weight, the opponent (should they comply with weight limits) will receive 3 points due to a walkover victory, regardless of winning or losing the bout, with the fighter who missed weight being deducted 1 standings point;  if the non-offending fighter subsequently wins with a stoppage, all bonus points will be awarded. A fighter who was unable to compete for any reason, will receive a 1-point
penalty (-1 point in the standings). The fighters who made weight will not receive a walkover, but will earn points and contracted purse amounts based on their performance in the altered matchup.

Heavyweight
The heavyweight roster included the current PFL Heavyweight champion Ali Isaev, the former UFC Heavyweight champion Fabricio Werdum, the former Jungle Fight champion Bruno Cappelozza, former ACB champion Denis Goltsov, M-1 Global title challenger Ante Delija, UFC veteran Justin Willis, Renan Ferreira, Hatef Moeil, Brandon Sayles and Mohammed Usman.

Light Heavyweight
The first nine light heavyweights announced for the 2021 season were the 2019 PFL champion Emiliano Sordi, the former UFC and Glory fighter Chris Camozzi, UFC veterans Cezar Ferreira, Jordan Johnson, Daniel Spohn and Tom Lawlor, Marthin Hamlet, Smealinho Rama and Jordan Young. Nick Roehrick was later added to the roster, while the former UFC middleweight Antônio Carlos Júnior joined the roster on March 6, 2021. PFL announced that Antônio Carlos Júnior will replace Jordan Johnson for the whole season. At the beginning of April, Smealinho Rama was replaced by Vinny Magalhães for the whole season. At weigh-ins of PFL 2, Vinny had to be taken to the hospital due to complications of his weight cut and was replaced by Askar Mozharov.

Welterweight
The first seven welterweights announced for the 2021 season were the 2019 PFL champion Ray Cooper III, former Bellator champion Rory MacDonald, PFL veteran Magomed Magomedkerimov, UFC veterans David Michaud and João Zeferino, Nikolai Aleksakhin and Sadibou Sy. Alexey Kunchenko was additionally announced for the 2021 season. Jason Ponet and former UFC Lightweight Gleison Tibau were later added on. After revealing a heart condition, David Michaud had to back out of the season and was replaced by Curtis Millender.

Sy replaced Zeferino because of an injury before the PFL semifinals.

Lightweight
The 2021 Lightweight roster included the two-time PFL Lightweight champion Natan Schulte, former UFC Lightweight champion Anthony Pettis, UFC veterans Olivier Aubin-Mercier, Clay Collard, Marcin Held and Johnny Case, as well as Akhmed Aliev, Joilton Lutterbach, Mikhail Odintsov and Loik Radzhabov. On April 7, 2021, Alexander Martinez replaced Johnny Case in the lightweight roster, after Case was charged with domestic battery.

Women's Lightweight
The women's 2021 roster included the 2019 PFL champion Kayla Harrison, Cindy Dandois, Genah Fabian, Olena Kolesnyk, Mariana Morais, Larissa Pacheco, Julija Pajic and Laura Sanchez. Kaitlin Young and Taylor Guardado rounded out the roster.

Pacheco was eliminated at the semifinals when she was two pounds over the lightweight limit.

Featherweight
Eight fighters were initially announced for the 2021 season. The two-time PFL champion Lance Palmer,  UFC veteran Sheymon Moraes, Bellator veteran Bubba Jenkins, Tyler Diamond, Sung Bin Jo, Movlid Khaybulaev, Brendan Loughnane and Jason Soares. Chris Wade, who previously competed in the PFL Lightweight division, was added to the featherweight roster. Anthony Dizy was later added as well. Jason Soares was not medically cleared, hence he was replaced by Lazar Stojadinovic.

♛ = Clinched playoff spot ---
E = Eliminated

See also
List of PFL events
List of current PFL fighters
 2021 in UFC
 2021 in Bellator MMA
 2021 in ONE Championship
 2021 in Absolute Championship Akhmat
 2021 in Rizin Fighting Federation
 2021 in Legacy Fighting Alliance

References

2021
2021 in mixed martial arts
Mixed martial arts in New York (state)
Sports in Manhattan
2021 in sports in New York (state)
Professional Fighters League